"Holiday" is a song by English rapper Dizzee Rascal, released as the third single from his fourth studio album, Tongue n' Cheek. It was produced by Calvin Harris, with chorus vocals by R&B singer Chrome. Harris originally wrote the song for girl group, The Saturdays, but it was rejected. The song was released digitally on 23 August 2009, with a physical copy that followed on 31 August 2009. The single debuted in the UK at number-one upon initial release, bringing Dizzee's total of number-one singles to three (four including charity singles), as well as marking the fourth top ten hit and twelfth top forty hit from the rapper.

Critical reception
Vicki of BBC Chart Blog gave the song a positive review stating:

"'Holiday' is a totally cheesy but totally harmless, fun song. It's designed to give people that are on holiday a great excuse to dance madly and us folks back home in Britain who need that holiday an even greater one. This song hasn't got the explosive feel that 'Bonkers' has and thus it doesn't have the same sense of longevity, but what it does have is a very now feel (not least because this song wouldn't have worked so well in November...)

Looking out the window now as I reach the end of this review, I'm amazed to see it has stopped raining and that the sun is trying to peep through the clouds. But then, maybe I shouldn't be that surprised – after all, this has officially been Dizzee's summer and this song is a little ray of sunshine." The song was awarded a 4 star.

Track listing
CD single
 "Holiday"  – 3:41
 "Holiday"  – 6:02
 "Holiday"  – 3:25
 "Live, Large N' In Charge" – 3:51

12" single
 "Holiday" 
 "Holiday" 
 "Live, Large N' In Charge"
 "Holiday" 
 "Holiday" 

iTunes Australian single
 "Holiday" 
 "Holiday" 
 "Live Large 'N' In Charge"

iTunes UK EP
 "Holiday" 
 "Holiday" 
 "Holiday" 
 "Live Large 'N' In Charge"
 "Holiday"

Credits and personnel
Writers: Dylan Mills, Calvin Harris, Nick Detnon
Producer: Calvin Harris
Instruments performed and arranged by Calvin Harris
Mixing: Calvin Harris
Lyrics written and performed by Dizzee Rascal
Chorus vocals performed by Chrome
Backing vocals performed by The Doctor 
Vocals recorded and produced by Nick Cage

Charts

Weekly charts

Year-end charts

Certifications

Release history

References

2009 singles
Dizzee Rascal songs
UK Singles Chart number-one singles
2009 songs
Songs written by Calvin Harris
Songs written by Dizzee Rascal